Elizabeth Spiers (born December 11, 1976) is an American web publisher and journalist, the founding editor of Gawker, a media gossip blog.

From February 2011 until August 2012 she was the editor of The New York Observer.

Early life and education
Spiers was born in Wetumpka, Alabama, and attended local schools. After graduating from Duke University in 1999 with a degree in public policy, Spiers headed to Wall Street to work in finance, but soon became involved in the fast-growing blog industry.

Career
Spiers started to work in journalism as the founding editor of Gawker.com and later became a contributing writer and editor at New York magazine. She has written for The New York Times, Salon, Fortune, Fast Company and The New York Post, among other publications, and was an early blogger at GNXP.

She worked briefly after that as the editor-in-chief of mediabistro.com, a site offering resources for media professionals. Since then, Spiers has founded a number of blog sites through her company, Dead Horse Media (as in the proverb "don't beat a dead horse"). The New York Times DealBook wrote of her in 2006, "It is clear that an online empire is on Elizabeth Spiers's mind." Dead Horse Media has produced Dealbreaker, a gossip website about Wall Street; AbovetheLaw, a blog about law; Fashionista, a gossip site about fashion; and Supermogul, a now defunct business management site. Spiers left Dead Horse Media abruptly on April 19, 2007, citing differences with her partners over launching new properties, according to BusinessWeek.

Jared Kushner hired Spiers as the editor of The New York Observer in February 2011. She resigned from the paper in August 2012. Spiers was the editorial director of Flavorpill from 2012 to 2016.

Spiers has been a guest speaker at various media and technology conferences. She has also been a guest commentator for CNN, Fox News, MarketWatch, MSNBC and VH1.

References

External links 
 
 

American women journalists
American online publication editors
1976 births
Living people
Sanford School of Public Policy alumni
People from Wetumpka, Alabama
American bloggers
Editors of New York City newspapers
Journalists from Alabama
Journalists from New York City
21st-century American non-fiction writers
Women newspaper editors
American women bloggers
21st-century American women writers